Mother Goose Club (MGC) is an educational nursery school program that streams on its eponymous YouTube channel and is produced by Sockeye Media LLC. Its YouTube channel has acquired more than 8 billion views and 7 million subscribers since 2009. Episodes of the program have also aired on PBS stations and are available on streaming platforms like Netflix, Amazon Prime Video, and Tubi. The show is made up of a series of educational live-action and animated segments, with a cast of six recurring characters who introduce classic nursery rhymes and other songs to children through catchy tunes, play, and interactive lessons.

Content

Each episode of Mother Goose Club contains multiple segments and follows a cast of six recurring characters—Baa Baa Sheep, Eep the Mouse, Little Bo Peep, Jack B. Nimble, Mary Quite Contrary, and Teddy Bear—who sing and dance to a variety of nursery rhymes and original songs. The live-action characters often perform in front of animated backdrops, although some sequences of the show feature fully-animated CGI versions of the cast. Episodes also often feature sketch-like segments that have narrative elements. The program's emphasis on words is designed to help young children learn early language skills, while rhymes and melodies encourage song participation and physical movement. The show also focuses on other early learning concepts such as letters, colors, and shape recognition.

The Mother Goose Club YouTube channel also contains a number of shorter, song-only videos that feature cast members and other performers singing nursery rhymes. Additional content can be found on the Mother Goose Club mobile app in the form of songs, books, games, and videos and on Netflix in the form of a nursery rhyme compilation. Sockeye Media also operates and produces content for associated YouTube channels including Mother Goose Club Playhouse and a Spanish-language version of the channel known as Mother Goose Club en Español. As of 2020, Spotify content can also be found on Prime Video, Kidoodle.TV, Tubi, and HappyKidsTV (among other platforms).

History 
The show was created by educators and parents of four, Harry Jho and Sona Jho of Sockeye Media. Mother Goose Club videos were initially uploaded to YouTube for the purpose of sharing content with industry professionals but developed an unexpectedly large following among the general population.

By 2011, Mother Goose Club had inadvertently become one of the largest YouTube kids' channels in the world. Episodes also appeared on PBS stations nationwide and in DVD compilations. In 2015, the Mother Goose Club channel was among the first content creators to appear on the YouTube Kids mobile app.

By 2016, a compilation of Mother Goose Club episodes had been licensed to Netflix. Beginning that year, Sockeye Media started presenting the Mother Goose Club series at both MIPCOM and MIPJunior, international conferences that bring together entertainment content players worldwide. It also announced a partnership with Foothill Entertainment on a new 52-episode, CGI-animated Mother Goose Club series. Each episode would be 11 minutes long and feature a story-driven narrative. The series went into development in 2018.

In 2017, Sockeye Media, together with developer Story Toys Entertainment (now Touch Press Inc.), created an app that brought Mother Goose Club books, videos, and games to iOS mobile devices. In June of that year, Sockeye Media announced its partnership with DHX Media's online kids' network WildBrain for managing Mother Goose Clubs YouTube channels and handling paid media campaigns. The deal aims to increase audiences and ad revenue by providing rights management and access to technical support.

In December 2019, Mother Goose Club episodes were added to the library of AVOD provider, Kidoodle.TV. In November 2020, it was announced that Mother Goose Club content would be available on the upcoming interactive children's app and streaming service, Hellosaurus. The app would allow children to interact directly with "gamified" episodes of the show. Mother Goose Club was also announced as a content producer for the upcoming kid-focused streaming app, Sensical, developed by Common Sense Media.

Reception and awards 

Across multiple channels on YouTube, Mother Goose Club has accumulated over 22 million subscribers and 21 billion views. Individual videos on its channels have also attained hundreds of millions of views. The show and its producer, Sockeye Media, have won or been nominated for numerous awards, including the following:

References

YouTube channels